Ordinal may refer to:

 Ordinal data, a statistical data type consisting of numerical scores that exist on an arbitrary numerical scale
 Ordinal date, a simple form of expressing a date using only the year and the day number within that year
 Ordinal Priority Approach, a multiple-criteria decision analysis method that aids in solving the group decision-making problems
 Ordinal indicator, the sign adjacent to a numeral denoting that it is an ordinal number
 Ordinal number in set theory, a number type with order structures
 Ordinal number (linguistics), a word representing the rank of a number
 Ordinal scale, ranking things that are not necessarily numbers
 Ordinal utility (economics): a utility function which is used only to describe the preference ordering between different outcomes.

Government
 Regnal ordinal, used to distinguish monarchs and popes with the same regnal name

Religion 
 Edwardine Ordinals, two early liturgical books of the Church of England
 Ordinal (liturgy), particularly in Anglicanism and Catholicism, is the book containing the rites for the ordination of deacons and priests, and the consecration of bishops
 Ordinal can be a book that gives the ordo (ritual and rubrics) for celebrations, see Order of Mass